Ḥaḑramautic or Ḥaḑramitic was the easternmost of the four known languages of the Old South Arabian subgroup of the Semitic languages. It was used in the Kingdom of Hadhramaut and also the area round the Hadhramite capital of Shabwa, in what is now Yemen. The Hadramites also controlled the trade in frankincense through their important trading post of Sumhuram (Hadramautic ), now Khor Rori in the Dhofar Governorate, Oman.

Script and phonology

Almost the entire body of evidence for the ancient Ḥaḑramautic language comes from inscriptions written in the monumental Old South Arabian script, consisting of 29 letters, and deriving from the Proto-Sinaitic script. The sounds of the language were essentially the same as those of Sabaean (see Sabaean language).

Noteworthy characteristics of Ḥaḑramautic include its tendency, especially in inscriptions from Wādī Ḥaḑramawt, to represent Old South Arabian ṯ as s3: thus we find s2ls3 ("three"; cf. Sabaean s2lṯ.) There are also instances where ṯ is written for an older form s3; e.g. Ḥaḑramautic mṯnad ("inscription"), which is msnd in the rest of Old South Arabian.

History
Potsherds with Old South Arabian letters on them, found in Raybūn, the old Ḥaḑramite capital, have been radiocarbon dated to the 12th century BC. The language was certainly in use from 800 BC but in the 4th century AD the Ḥaḑramite Kingdom was conquered by the Ḥimyarites, who used Sabaean as an official language, and since then there are no more records in Ḥaḑramautic.

During the course of the language’s history there appeared particular phonetic changes, such as the change from ˤ to ˀ, from ẓ to ṣ, from ṯ to s3. As in other Semitic languages n can be assimilated to a following consonant, compare ʾnfs1 "souls" > ʾfs1

In Ḥaḑramautic the third person pronouns begin with s1. It has feminine forms ending in ṯ and s3.

References

Bibliography
Leonid Kogan and Andrey Korotayev: "Sayhadic Languages (Epigraphic South Arabian)" in Semitic Languages. London: Routledge, 1997, p. 157-183.

Languages attested from the 8th century BC
Old South Arabian languages
Extinct languages of Asia
Languages of Yemen